Honeymoon Bay is an unincorporated community in the Canadian province of British Columbia. In 2011, its population was listed at 580.

Historically, its main industry has been forestry.

Many years ago a lonely young bachelor in this area announced he would return to England to find a bride. The community took the name Honeymoon Bay as a result but he never returned.

Honeymoon Bay is one of several towns in the Cowichan Valley with significant South Asian Canadian (primarily Sikh-Canadian) community history for over 130 years, gaining notoriety in the forestry industry at local sawmills from the early 20th century until the 1980s.

References

External links
 Honeymoon Bay's own website
 Honeymoon Bay Area Information

Unincorporated settlements in British Columbia
Populated places in the Cowichan Valley Regional District